Stotonyak is a populated place situated on the San Xavier Indian Reservation in Pima County, Arizona, United States. To differentiate from the village of a similar name on the Gila River Indian Community, the Office of Indian Affairs recommended that this village use the Papago, or Tohono O'odham spelling, while the Gila River reservation village use the Pima, or Akimel O'otham spelling, Stotonic. The recommendation was followed by the Board on Geographic Names in their 1941 decision. In the O'odham language, stotonyak means "many ants.

Notes

References

Populated places in Pima County, Arizona